Gareth Jones (born 5 July 1961), also known as Gaz Top, is a Welsh television presenter.

Best known for his work as a presenter of children's television and science programmes such as How 2 and Get Fresh, he has more recently moved to presenting motorsport podcasts and directing and producing programmes. In the summer of 2021 he became the first person to swim across Wales from south to north, whilst making a three-part documentary series for Welsh broadcaster S4C called Gareth Jones: Nofio Adre.

Career 
Jones was born in St Asaph, Wales, and grew up in Holywell, Flintshire. When he began his career in 1979, he used the name "Gaz Top", a name he earned whilst working as a roadie for The Alarm.

Gareth Jones On Speed podcast
Gareth Jones On Speed is a car and motorsport podcast written and performed by Gareth Jones and made by TV and podcasting production company WhizzBang.

Hosted by Jones, the show has an irreverent style and features a regular cast of Zog (AKA musician and journalist Paul Ireson) Richard Porter (creator of cult web-site Sniff Petrol and Script Editor previously of BBC's Top Gear and now of Amazon's The Grand Tour) and TV presenter and writer Violet Berlin. The show began in August 2005 after a visit to the British Grand Prix at Silverstone. Whilst chiefly an audio podcast there are occasional video episodes such as the London Grand Prix and Don't Call Me Carface.

Many major British and international motor sport stars have appeared on the show, such as Jenson Button, Lewis Hamilton, Robert Kubica. New editions are published roughly every 12 days and over 350 episodes in total have appeared to date.

Personal life 
He lives in north London with his partner, Violet Berlin, and their two sons. He is a Welsh language speaker.

References

External links 
 Growing up: Gareth Jones BBC, "my old school, Ysgol Gwenffrwd in Holywell"
 YouTube video clip of Gareth Jones interviewing
 
 

1961 births
Living people
Welsh television presenters
People from St Asaph
People educated at Ysgol Glan Clwyd